Polmarth is a hamlet in the civil parish of Wendron, in west Cornwall, England.

References

Hamlets in Cornwall